Thabo Patrick Sefolosha (born May 2, 1984) is a Swiss professional basketball player for Vevey Riviera Basket of the Swiss Basketball League (SBL). He has played in the NBA for the Chicago Bulls, Oklahoma City Thunder, Atlanta Hawks, Utah Jazz and Houston Rockets, in the Turkish Basketball League for the Fenerbahçe, in France for Élan Chalon, in Italy for Angelico Biella, and in Switzerland for Vevey Riviera Basket. In 2006, he became the first player from Switzerland to play in the NBA, and in 2013, he was labelled the best Swiss basketball player of all-time by Swiss newspaper Freiburger Nachrichten.

Early life
Sefolosha was born in Vevey, Switzerland to Patrick Sefolosha, a black South African musician, and Christine Sefolosha (née Beck), a Swiss artist. In his youth, he has visited and lived in several countries. He speaks French, Italian and English.

Professional career

Early years (2001–2006)
Sefolosha was invited to join the junior Swiss national basketball team, and at 17 he began a professional career with Tege Riviera Basket, in Switzerland's top domestic league. On a team trip to France, Sefolosha was approached by a French talent scout to play with Elan Chalon in the premier pro league in France.

Sefolosha spent his first year in Chalon-sur-Saône playing with the junior under-21 squad, which traveled alongside the senior club. The following year (2002–03), he earned a rotation spot on the senior club, where he played 30 games and averaged 4 points, 3.5 rebounds and 1 assist per game.

The following season, Sefolosha earned a starting spot on the senior team, which he helped lead to a third-place finish in the French league, where his team advanced to the playoffs semifinals. During the season, he averaged 9.4 points, 7 rebounds, and 1 steal in 30.7 minutes per game.

Before the start of his fourth season with Elan Chalon, a contract dispute between Sefolosha and the team arose. Sefolosha's agent and the team president could not reach an agreement on a new contract, so Sefolosha signed with Italian team Angelico Biella. "Last summer, I had the chance to re-negotiate my contract with the club. We were supposed to reach an agreement, but when my agent and the president started talking, they couldn't agree on a contract. They wanted to keep me, but at the same time I had this offer from Italy. That's when I decided that the best thing for my career was to play in Biella. Yes, there was a little bit of trouble, but in the end it was OK."

Chicago Bulls (2006–2009)
Sefolosha was taken with the 13th pick of the 2006 NBA draft by the Philadelphia 76ers and promptly traded to the Chicago Bulls for the 16th pick (Rodney Carney), and cash considerations. In an article on Bulls.com, Sefolosha was quoted saying "I was certainly surprised (at the draft) when someone came up and said that I was the next to be picked. I thought maybe he had made a mistake or something. But a few minutes later he came back and told me that not only was I going to be picked, but that I was going to be traded to Chicago, which really got me excited."

Bulls head coach Scott Skiles cited Sefolosha's wingspan and past pro basketball experience as reasons why the Bulls were interested in him. "Thabo's got great physical gifts that, frankly, a lot of guys in the league just don't have. He's got tremendous length and has really quick hands, he grabs your attention whenever you watch him play. It's easy to see that he knows what he's doing out there. You can tell he likes to play defense, too. He's eager to get after it."

After the NBA summer leagues finished, ESPN asked several NBA talent scouts and executives to rank the summer league players and Sefolosha scored high. "He excelled at just about everything", reported one of the professionals. "Thabo Sefolosha showed that he's going to be able to step in right away and contribute to the Bulls."

Oklahoma City Thunder (2009–2014)
On February 19, 2009, the trade deadline, Sefolosha was traded by the Bulls to the Oklahoma City Thunder for Denver's 2009 first-round draft pick, which Chicago used to draft Taj Gibson. Sefolosha was selected to the All-NBA Defensive Second Team for the 2009–10 NBA season.

In October 2011, during the 2011 NBA lockout, Sefolosha signed with Fenerbahçe Ülker in Turkey, but only for Euroleague matches. His deal had an out-clause that allowed him to return to Oklahoma City at the end of the lockout. He played 7 matches with Fenerbahçe Ülker during the 2011–12 Euroleague season.

In 2012, Sefolosha and the Thunder reached the NBA Finals, but were defeated by the Miami Heat.

Atlanta Hawks (2014–2017)

On July 15, 2014, Sefolosha was acquired by the Atlanta Hawks in a sign-and-trade deal, along with rights to Giorgos Printezis, in exchange for the rights to Sofoklis Schortsanitis. On January 31, 2015, he was ruled out for six to eight weeks with a strained right calf. On April 9, he was ruled out for the rest of the regular season due to a fractured tibia suffered while being arrested by members of the New York City Police Department.

Utah Jazz (2017–2019)
On July 18, 2017, Sefolosha signed a multi-year deal with the Utah Jazz. On January 12, 2018, in Utah's 99–88 loss to the Charlotte Hornets, Sefolosha suffered a right MCL injury. He underwent season-ending surgery five days later. On April 3, 2018, he was suspended without pay for five games for violating the terms of the NBA/NBPA Anti-Drug Program.

Houston Rockets (2019–2020)
On September 23, 2019, Sefolosha signed a one-year deal with the Houston Rockets.

Sefolosha announced his retirement from professional basketball on March 31, 2021.

Vevey Riviera Basket (2023–present)
Despite announcing his retirement nearly two years ago, Sefolosha had been reported to have inked a deal with the Swiss team Vevey Riviera Basket.

Career statistics

NBA

Regular season

|-
| align="left" | 
| align="left" | Chicago
| 71 || 4 || 12.2 || .426 || .357 || .511 || 2.2 || .8 || .5 || .2 || 3.6
|-
| align="left" | 
| align="left" | Chicago
| 69 || 22 || 20.8 || .428 || .330 || .721 || 3.7 || 1.9 || .9 || .4 || 6.7
|-
| align="left" | 
| align="left" | Chicago
| 43 || 14 || 17.1 || .434 || .300 || .840 || 2.9 || 1.5 || .8 || .4 || 4.5
|-
| align="left" | 
| align="left" | Oklahoma City
| 23 || 22 || 31.1 || .417 || .243 || .833 || 5.2 || 2.0 || 1.7 || 1.1 || 8.5
|-
| align="left" | 
| align="left" | Oklahoma City
| 82 || 82 || 28.6 || .440 || .313 || .674 || 4.7 || 1.8 || 1.2 || .6 || 6.0
|-
| align="left" | 
| align="left" | Oklahoma City
| 79 || 79 || 25.9 || .471 || .275 || .747 || 4.4 || 1.4 || 1.2 || .5 || 5.1
|-
| align="left" | 
| align="left" | Oklahoma City
| 42 || 42 || 21.8 || .432 || .437 || .884 || 3.0 || 1.1 || .9 || .4 || 4.8
|-
| align="left" | 
| align="left" | Oklahoma City
| 81 || 81 || 27.5 || .481 || .419 || .826 || 3.9 || 1.5 || 1.3 || .5 || 7.6
|-
| align="left" | 
| align="left" | Oklahoma City
| 61 || 61 || 26.0 || .415 || .316 || .768 || 3.6 || 1.5 || 1.3 || .3 || 6.3
|-
| align="left" | 
| align="left" | Atlanta
| 52 || 7 || 18.8 || .418 || .321 || .776 || 4.3 || 1.4 || 1.0 || .4 || 5.3
|-
| align="left" | 
| align="left" | Atlanta
| 75 || 11 || 23.4 || .505 || .339 || .626 || 4.5 || 1.4 || 1.1 || .5 || 6.4
|-
| align="left" | 
| align="left" | Atlanta
| 62 || 42 || 25.7 || .441 || .342 || .733 || 4.4 || 1.7 || 1.5 || .5 || 7.2
|-
| align="left" | 
| align="left" | Utah
| 38 || 6 || 21.2 || .492 || .381 || .815 || 4.2 || 0.9 || 1.4 || .3 || 8.2
|-
| align="left" | 
| align="left" | Utah
| 50 || 2 || 12.2 || .477 || .436 || .636 || 2.5 || 0.5 || 0.9 || .1 || 3.8
|-
| align="left" | 
| align="left" | Houston
| 41 || 0 || 10.6 || .407 || .278 || .375 || 2.3 || 0.6 || 0.6 || .3 || 2.2
|- class="sortbottom"
| style="text-align:center;" colspan="2"| Career
| 869 || 475 || 21.9 || .449 || .349 || .732 || 3.7 || 1.4 || 1.1 || .4 || 5.7

Playoffs

|-
| align="left" | 2007
| align="left" | Chicago
| 9 || 0 || 11.0 || .385 || .375 || .583 || 1.9 || .8 || .2 || .0 || 3.3
|-
| align="left" | 2010
| align="left" | Oklahoma City
| 6 || 6 || 21.2 || .296 || .231 || .889 || 3.0 || 1.2 || .8 || 1.0 || 4.5
|-
| align="left" | 2011
| align="left" | Oklahoma City
| 17 || 17 || 20.2 || .463 || .154 || 1.000 || 3.1 || .7 || .9 || .3 || 4.6
|-
| align="left" | 2012
| align="left" | Oklahoma City
| 20 || 20 || 22.3 || .402 || .327 || .889 || 2.7 || 1.3 || 1.5 || .5 || 5.3
|-
| align="left" | 2013
| align="left" | Oklahoma City
| 11 || 11 || 27.3 || .344 || .316 || .818 || 4.5 || 2.1 || 1.1 || .5 || 5.7
|-
| style="text-align:left;"| 2014
| style="text-align:left;"| Oklahoma City
| 13 || 13 || 17.5 || .415 || .261 || .800 || 2.1 || .7 || .8 || .0 || 4.2
|-
| style="text-align:left;"| 2016
| style="text-align:left;"| Atlanta
| 10 || 2 || 20.3 || .478 || .368 || .533 || 4.1 || 1.7 || 1.0 || .6 || 5.9
|-
| style="text-align:left;"| 2017
| style="text-align:left;"| Atlanta
| 4 || 0 || 2.3 || .000 || - || .250 || .0 || .0 || .0 || .0 || .3
|-
| style="text-align:left;"| 2019
| style="text-align:left;"| Utah
| 4 || 0 || 10.5 || .143 || .125 || - || 2.0 || .5 || .0 || .0 || 1.3
|- class="sortbottom"
| style="text-align:center;" colspan="2"| Career
| 96 || 69 || 18.8 || .396 || .283 || .744 || 2.8 || 1.1 || .9 || .3 || 4.4

Euroleague

|-
| align="left" | 2011–12
| align="left" | Fenerbahçe
| 7 || 6 || 26.9 || .529 || .500 || .633 || 6.0 || .9 || 2.1 || .4 || 11.4 || 14.3
|- class="sortbottom"
| style="text-align:center;" colspan="2"| Career
| 7 || 6 || 26.9 || .529 || .500 || .633 || 6.0 || .9 || 2.1 || .4 || 11.4 || 14.3

Personal life
On April 8, 2015, Sefolosha and teammate Pero Antić were arrested outside a nightclub in New York City for allegedly interfering with police after Chris Copeland of the Indiana Pacers was stabbed in the abdomen following an argument. During the altercation, the NYPD officers broke Sefolosha's right leg, shutting him down for the rest of the season. He underwent surgery on April 16, to repair a fractured tibia and ligament damage.

The prosecution offered Sefolosha a plea bargain, which would have involved a dismissal of the charges after six months, but Sefolosha refused it on September 9, 2015, even though his attorney, Alex Spiro, urged him to take it. Sefolosha said that he wanted to let the case proceed to trial instead; at the same time, charges against Antić were dropped. Sefolosha's court hearing was set on October 5, 2015. On October 9, a Manhattan jury found him not guilty of all three misdemeanor charges: obstructing government administration, disorderly conduct and resisting arrest. On October 21, 2015, Sefolosha announced he would be suing the city of New York as well as eight police officers for up to $50 million in damages. On April 9, 2017, it was announced Sefolosha had settled with the NYPD for $4 million, a "substantial portion" of which he donated to Gideon's Promise, a nonprofit organization dedicated to educating public defenders.

In October 2017, Sefolosha revealed that he saved a woman the previous month from drowning while he and his family were on a rafting trip down the Provo River.

See also 

 
 List of European basketball players in the United States

References

External links

 Sefolosha's official website
 Thabo Sefolosha at euroleague.net
 
 

1984 births
Living people
Atlanta Hawks players
Chicago Bulls players
Élan Chalon players
Swiss expatriate basketball people in France
Swiss expatriate basketball people in Turkey
Swiss expatriate basketball people in the United States
Fenerbahçe men's basketball players
Houston Rockets players
National Basketball Association players from Switzerland
Oklahoma City Thunder players
Pallacanestro Biella players
People from Vevey
Philadelphia 76ers draft picks
Shooting guards
Small forwards
Swiss expatriate basketball people in Italy
Swiss men's basketball players
Swiss people of South African descent
South African expatriate sportspeople in France
South African expatriate sportspeople in Italy
South African expatriate sportspeople in Turkey
South African expatriate sportspeople in the United States
Utah Jazz players
Vevey Riviera Basket players
Sportspeople from the canton of Vaud